Gözde Zay is a Turkish fashion model and former beauty pageant contestant.  Gözde won the Miss Earth Turkey 2007 title, and represented Turkey in the Miss Earth 2009 pageant in Boracay, Philippines.

She married Greek singer and composer Alexandros Michos in 2010.

She used to attempt some theatre classes in 16 years old. She act main role  in (Time of gypsies) and (Heroin) theatre performances. After high school, she left her first University to study Performing Arts and started İstanbul Bilgi University in 2003.

She took place in  fashion shows and shootings around the world.  She won Miss Turkey Earth 2007 title and represented Turkey in Miss earth Philippines in 2009.

She is a member of many association related children and woman rights. Because of her Political awareness she has called as 'Einstein of model world'  in Most famous authors dictionary (ekşi sözlük) 

She took place in FHM Australia June 2010 with the world stars Jennifer Love Hewitt and Bradley Cooper. FHM Aussie mentioned her GOZDE ZAY in 4 page "Young Turk - gorgeous, exotic and principled, Turkish model Gozde Zay is a cause for righteous celebration" story with 4 photos, 2 are full page  Same year she took her place in the hottest models around the world chosen by FHM Aussie readers. The whole list:

THE GIRLS OF FHM

The World's Hottest, Sexiest Babes! 7/10

120 Pages of Smokin' Hot Girls from around the world!

USA: 
Katie Cassidy

Australia: 
Mackenzie Taylor 
Pia Muehlenbeck

Thailand:
Morakot "Emmy" Kittisara 
May Pitcharnard 
"Pang" Aurajira Laemwilai

Czech Republic:
Eliska Podlipna 
Hana Svobodova 
China:
Bai Ling

Germany:
Laura Pott 
German Models Lingerie Special 
Holland:
Yolanthe

Turkey: 
Gozde Zay 
Tugce Kazaz

Taiwan: 
Amber Xinya 
Malaysia 
Fei Sen

Russia: 
Mobile Blonds 
Mexico 
Karen 

She also took her place in FHM Turkey 100 sexiest women around the world.

She get married with Greek singer and Composer Alexandros Michos in 2010 and Divorced 2013. Couple has 1 kid.

References

External links
 Official website

Turkish female models
Miss Earth 2009 contestants
Living people
1984 births